Gallastegui is a Basque surname. Notable people with the surname include:

Miguel Gallastegui (1918–2019), Spanish pelota player
 (1902–1988), Spanish military personnel
Aratz Gallastegui (born 1976), Spanish rugby union player

Basque-language surnames